Kell is a surname. Notable people with the surname include:

People with the surname
 Allan Kell (born 1949), English footballer
 Ayla Kell (born 1990), American actress
 Cassandra Kell (born 1980), Australian football goalkeeper
 Charles Kell (1905–1964), Australian rugby league player
 Chip Kell (born 1949), former Canadian Football League player
 Douglas Kell (born 1953), British biochemist
 Edward Kell (c. 1831–1908), British trade unionist and politician
 Ernie Kell (1928–2017), American politician
 Elizabeth Kell (born 1983), Australian rower
 Georg Kell, German business ethicist and UN official
 George Kell (footballer) (1896–1985), English football player
 George Kell (1922–2009), American baseball player
 John McIntosh Kell (1823–1900), Confederate naval officer
 Joseph Kell, pseudonym of British novelist Anthony Burgess
 Paul Kell (1915–1977), American football player
 Raymond D. Kell (1904–1986), American television researcher
 Reginald Kell (1906–1981), British clarinetist
 Richard Kell (footballer) (born 1979), English footballer
 Richard Kell (poet) (born 1927), Irish poet
 Rob Kell (1902–1983), English civil engineer
 Skeeter Kell (1929–2015), American baseball player
 Trey Kell (born 1996), American basketball player
 Troy Kell (born 1968), American murderer
 Vernon Kell (1873–1942), British intelligence director

Fictional characters
Jarmen Kell, a mercenary for the Global Liberation Army in the video game Command and Conquer: Generals and Command and Conquer: Generals Zero Hour
Morgan and Patrick Kell, founders of the mercenary unit Kell Hounds in the BattleTech universe
Phelan Kell, son of Morgan Kell and Salome Ward, junior Khan of Clan Wolf, and later senior Khan of Clan Wolf in Exile in the BattleTech universe